Storyboard is a BBC drama anthology series of six 30-minute plays, mostly written by Troy Kennedy Martin, the first series created by the screenwriter.  The series was followed by Studio 4.

Episodes
 "The Gentleman from Paris" (based on a book by John Dickson Carr)
 "The Magic Barrel" (based on a book by Bernard Malamud)
 "The Middle Men"
 "The Long Spoon" (based on a short story by John Wyndham)
 "I'll Be Waiting" (based on a book by Raymond Chandler)
 "Tickets to Trieste" (based on a book by Ken Wlaschen)

Status
The entirety of the show is missing from the BBC archives.

References

External links
 

1961 British television series debuts
1961 British television series endings
BBC television dramas
1960s British anthology television series
Lost BBC episodes
1960s British drama television series
Black-and-white British television shows
English-language television shows